Diocese of Tezpur is a Roman Catholic diocese that has its seat in Tezpur, which is in Assam, India. It was founded in 1964.

Bishops of Tezpur
 Oreste Marengo, S.D.B. (6 Jul 1964 Appointed - 26 Jun 1969 Resigned)
 Joseph Mittathany (26 Jun 1969 Appointed - 28 Mar 1980 Appointed, Bishop of Imphal)
 Robert Kerketta, S.D.B. (24 Oct 1980 Appointed - 3 Dec 2007 Retired)
 Michael Akasius Toppo (3 Dec 2007 Appointed - )

References

External links 
GCatholic.org
The diocese on Catholic hierarchy

Tezpur
Christianity in Assam
Tezpur
Christian organizations established in 1964
Roman Catholic dioceses and prelatures established in the 20th century
1964 establishments in Assam